Bazire is a surname. Notable people with the surname include: 

Charles Bazire (1624–1677), businessmen in New France
Francis Bazire (born 1939), retired French cyclist
Jean-Michel Bazire (born 1971), French harness racing driver
Louis Bazire (1877–1923), French politician
Reginald Bazire (1900–1990), British Anglican priest